Heinemannomyces is a fungal genus in the family Agaricaceae.
 This is a monotypic genus, containing the single species Heinemannomyces splendidissima, which was defined in 1998 by Roy Watling.  It is found in peninsular Malaysia and China.

The mushrooms have a woolly veil and blue/grey gills and the flesh reddens when injured.

See also
List of Agaricaceae genera
List of Agaricales genera

References

Agaricaceae
Fungi of Asia
Monotypic Agaricales genera